Amada Bata (1964) (English  The Untrodden Road) is a classic Odia film directed by Amar Ganguly based on  eminent Odia woman writer of yester years Basanta Kumari Patnaik's novel masterpiece Amada Bata (1930), whose primary concern is the character Maya, before and after her marriage.

Cast
 Jharana Das  - Maya
 Umakant Mishra
 Akshya Mahanty
 Laxmipriya Mahapatra
 Krishanpriya Mahapatra
 Menaka
 Kiran
 Brundabana
 Gita Das- Kaberi

Songs 
 Jibana Jamuna Re
 Lyric:Narayan Prasad Singh, Singer: Nirmala Mishra

References

External links
 Review of Amada Bata in www.chakpak.com
 Casting & Crew of Amada Bata in ccat.sas.upenn.edu

1964 films
1964 drama films
1960s Odia-language films